Bishop White may refer to:
Alma Bridwell White (1862–1946), Bishop of the Pillar of Fire Church
Arthur Kent White (1889–1981), Bishop of the Pillar of Fire Church
William White (Bishop of Pennsylvania) (1748-1836), Episcopal bishop and United States Senate Chaplain
William White (Bishop of Newfoundland) (1865-1943), Anglican bishop in Canada
William White (Bishop of Honan) (1873-1960), Anglican bishop in China